Structural Semantics: An Analysis of Part of the Vocabulary of Plato is a 1963 book by Sir John Lyons. It is a revised edition of Lyons' PhD dissertation titled A structural theory of semantics and its application to some lexical subsystems in the vocabulary of Plato (1960).

Reception
The book was reviewed by J. Gonda, Édouard des Places,  John M. Rist, C. J. Ruijgh, L. Zgusta, David B. Robinson and Henry M. Hoenigswald.

References

External links
Structural Semantics: An Analysis of Part of the Vocabulary of Plato

1963 non-fiction books
Wiley (publisher) books
Books in semantics
Theses